Bulia confirmans is a moth of the family Erebidae. It is found in Cuba, Jamaica, Haiti, the Dominican Republic, Puerto Rico, Grenada, northern Venezuela and Colombia.

The larvae feed on Jatropha gossypiifolia.

References

Moths described in 1858
confirmans